Hamilton Park Historic District may refer to:

Hamilton Park Historic District (Jersey City, New Jersey), listed on the National Register of Historic Places in Hudson County
Hamilton Park Historic District (Columbus, Ohio), listed on the National and Columbus historic registers

See also
Hamilton Park (disambiguation)